For Earth Below is guitarist and songwriter Robin Trower's third solo album with cover art by "Funky" Paul Olsen. It was released in 1975.

Track listing
All tracks composed by Robin Trower; except where indicated

Side one
"Shame the Devil" – 3:13
"It's Only Money" – 5:38
"Confessin' Midnight" – 5:51
"Fine Day" (James Dewar, Robin Trower) – 3:36

Side two
"Alethea" – 3:02
"A Tale Untold" – 5:28
"Gonna Be More Suspicious" (Dewar, Trower) – 3:05
"For Earth Below" – 6:05

Personnel
 Robin Trower – guitar
 James Dewar – bass, vocals
 Bill Lordan – drums

Charts

References

External links 
 Robin Trower For Earth Below (1975) album releases & credits at Discogs
 Robin Trower For Earth Below (1975) album to be listened on Spotify
 Robin Trower For Earth Below (1975) album to be listened on YouTube

1975 albums
Robin Trower albums
Albums produced by Matthew Fisher
Chrysalis Records albums